Shuhan-e Sofla (also Romanized as Shūhān-e Soflá; also known as Shāhūn-e Soflá, Shoohan, Shūhān, and Ţorfīān) is a village in Qeblehi Rural District, in the Central District of Dezful County, Khuzestan Province, Iran. At the 2006 census, its population was 406, in 70 families.

References 

Populated places in Dezful County